Cayman Islands competed in the 2010 Commonwealth Games held in Delhi, India, from 3 to 14 October 2010. They won their first ever gold medal through Cydonie Mothersille in the 200m athletics for women.

Medalists

Swimming

See also
 2010 Commonwealth Games

Nations at the 2010 Commonwealth Games
Cayman Islands at the Commonwealth Games
2010 in Caymanian sport